Zuri Lawrence (born June 22, 1970) is an American professional boxer who competed from 1994 to 2009. He is most well-known for having never scored a knockout win in 44 professional fights.

Career
Lawrence has never fought for a major heavyweight title but he served an important test for up-and-coming prospects. Notable losses include a technical knockout loss in 11 (after being down 4 times) to Russian prospect Sultan Ibragimov and being brutally rendered unconscious by Calvin Brock, the latter of which was named  The Ring magazine Knockout of the Year.

Notable wins include upsetting the comeback trail of Jameel McCline after McCline's second heavyweight title loss and being the first to defeat highly touted Italian Olympic medallist and prospect Paolo Vidoz.

Lawrence was rarely stopped and could give 12 rounds of technical boxing. This combined with his seeming inability to knock an opponent out made Lawrence a popular opponent amongst matchmakers looking to get their prospects noticed. Prior to their fight Calvin Brock gave an example of this thinking in an interview with Tiger Boxing: "Zuri Lawrence? Sure. He's good, but he doesn't have any power, so I wouldn't call it a high-risk fight."

In November 2007 Lawrence took on Hasim Rahman on short notice on Versus. In a close battle in which Versus' viewers had Lawrence leading, he was knocked out by Rahman in the 10th and final round. The scores at the time of stoppage were 86-84 for Lawrence and 86-84, 88-82 for Rahman. In a rare feat, Lawrence was knocked out of the ring and onto the arena floor, only to return to the ring prior to the 20 count and continue fighting.

In July 2008 Lawrence won in a huge upset over heavyweight prospect Albert Sosnowski after taking the fight on late notice.

He fought Jason Estrada on September 2, 2009 and which Lawrence was knocked down once in the second and once in the seventh before the referee stopped the fight at 2:33.

Professional boxing record

|-
|align="center" colspan=8|24 Wins (0 knockouts, 24 decisions), 15 Losses (8 knockouts, 7 decisions), 4 Draws, 1 No Contest 
|-
| align="center" style="border-style: none none solid solid; background: #e3e3e3"|Result
| align="center" style="border-style: none none solid solid; background: #e3e3e3"|Record
| align="center" style="border-style: none none solid solid; background: #e3e3e3"|Opponent
| align="center" style="border-style: none none solid solid; background: #e3e3e3"|Type
| align="center" style="border-style: none none solid solid; background: #e3e3e3"|Round
| align="center" style="border-style: none none solid solid; background: #e3e3e3"|Date
| align="center" style="border-style: none none solid solid; background: #e3e3e3"|Location
| align="center" style="border-style: none none solid solid; background: #e3e3e3"|Notes
|-align=center
|Loss
|24-15-4 
|align=left| Jason Estrada
|TKO
|7
|02/09/2009
|align=left| Mohegan Sun Grandstand, Syracuse, New York, U.S.
|align=left|
|-
|Win
|24-14-4 
|align=left| Albert Sosnowski
|UD
|8
|06/08/2008
|align=left| Aviator Sports Complex, New York City, New York, U.S.
|align=left|
|-
|Loss
|23-14-4 
|align=left| Darrel Madison
|UD
|8
|30/05/2008
|align=left| Monticello Raceway & Casino, Monticello, New York, U.S.
|align=left|
|-
|Loss
|23-13-4 
|align=left| Hasim Rahman
|TKO
|10
|15/11/2007
|align=left| Sovereign Center, Reading, Pennsylvania, U.S.
|align=left|
|-
|Win
|23-12-4 
|align=left| Jermaine Woods
|UD
|8
|26/10/2007
|align=left| Monticello Raceway & Casino, Monticello, New York, U.S.
|align=left|
|-
|Win
|22-12-4 
|align=left| Jason Bergman
|UD
|4
|03/08/2007
|align=left| Monticello Raceway & Casino, Monticello, New York, U.S.
|align=left|
|-
|Win
|21-12-4 
|align=left| Harvey Jolly
|UD
|6
|29/06/2007
|align=left| Connecticut Expo Center, Hartford, Connecticut, U.S.
|align=left|
|-
|Loss
|20-12-4 
|align=left| Dominick Guinn
|TKO
|2
|02/02/2007
|align=left| Main Street Armory, Rochester, New York, U.S.
|align=left|
|-
|Loss
|20-11-4 
|align=left| Calvin Brock
|KO
|6
|25/02/2006
|align=left| Mandalay Bay Resort & Casino, Paradise, Nevada, U.S.
|align=left|
|-
|Win
|20-10-4 
|align=left| Jameel McCline
|UD
|10
|21/10/2005
|align=left| Seminole Hard Rock Hotel & Casino, Hollywood, Florida, U.S.
|align=left|
|-
|Loss
|19-10-4 
|align=left| Sultan Ibragimov
|TKO
|11
|22/04/2005
|align=left| Tropicana Hotel & Casino, Atlantic City, New Jersey, U.S.
|align=left|
|-
|Win
|19-9-4 
|align=left| Demetrice King
|UD
|6
|24/08/2004
|align=left| Mid-Hudson Civic Center, Poughkeepsie, New York, U.S.
|align=left|
|-
|Loss
|18-9-4 
|align=left| Timo Hoffmann
|UD
|12
|22/11/2003
|align=left| Erdgas Arena, Riesa, Germany
|align=left|
|-
| Draw
|18-8-4 
|align=left| Ray Austin
|MD
|10
|15/02/2003
|align=left| Flamingo Hilton, Laughlin, Nevada, U.S.
|align=left|
|-
|Loss
|18-8-3 
|align=left| Tony Thompson
|TKO
|7
|20/10/2002
|align=left| Emerald Queen Casino, Tacoma, Washington, U.S.
|align=left|
|-
|Win
|18-7-3 
|align=left| Paolo Vidoz
|UD
|8
|17/08/2002
|align=left| Taj Majal Hotel & Casino, Atlantic City, New Jersey, U.S.
|align=left|
|-
|Win
|17-7-3 
|align=left| David Vedder
|UD
|6
|25/05/2002
|align=left| Hilton Hotel, Las Vegas, Nevada, U.S.
|align=left|
|-
|Win
|16-7-3 
|align=left| Louis Monaco
|UD
|6
|04/05/2001
|align=left| Mohegan Sun Casino, Uncasville, Connecticut, U.S.
|align=left|
|-
|Win
|15-7-3 
|align=left| King Ipitan
|DQ
|9
|24/08/2000
|align=left| Coeur d'Alene Casino, Worley, Idaho, U.S.
|align=left|
|-
|Win
|14-7-3 
|align=left| Anthony Moore
|PTS
|8
|29/04/2000
|align=left| St John's, Antigua and Barbuda
|align=left|
|-
|Win
|13-7-3 
|align=left| Mike Sedillo
|UD
|10
|06/04/2000
|align=left| Coeur d'Alene Casino, Worley, Idaho, U.S.
|align=left|
|-
|Loss
|12-7-3 
|align=left| David Bostice
|UD
|10
|02/03/2000
|align=left| Ramada Inn, Rosemont, Illinois, U.S.
|align=left|
|-
|Loss
|12-6-3 
|align=left| Brian Nix
|UD
|8
|07/10/1999
|align=left| Soaring Eagle Casino, Mount Pleasant, Michigan, U.S.
|align=left|
|-
|Win
|12-5-3 
|align=left| Darroll Wilson
|UD
|10
|02/09/1999
|align=left| City Center, Saratoga Springs, New York, U.S.
|align=left|
|-
|Win
|11-5-3 
|align=left| Brian Watson
|DQ
|6
|09/07/1999
|align=left| Cape Cod Melody Tent, Hyannis, Massachusetts, U.S.
|align=left|
|-
|Win
|10-5-3 
|align=left| Domingo Monroe
|PTS
|4
|15/05/1999
|align=left| Leominster, Massachusetts, U.S.
|align=left|
|-
|Win
|9-5-3 
|align=left| Juan Quintana
|PTS
|4
|27/02/1999
|align=left| Leominster, Massachusetts, U.S.
|align=left|
|-
|Win
|8-5-3 
|align=left| Derek Williams
|PTS
|6
|02/10/1998
|align=left| Hala Ludowa, Wrocław, Poland
|align=left|
|-
|Loss
|7-5-3 
|align=left| Furkat Tursunov
|PTS
|8
|25/09/1998
|align=left| Poznań, Poland
|align=left|
|-
|Loss
|7-4-3 
|align=left| Willie Williams
|PTS
|6
|22/11/1997
|align=left| Taj Majal Hotel & Casino, Atlantic City, New Jersey, U.S.
|align=left|
|-
|Loss
|7-3-3 
|align=left| Greg Pickrom
|TKO
|5
|11/09/1997
|align=left| Foxwoods Resort Casino, Ledyard, Connecticut, U.S.
|align=left|
|-
|Win
|7-2-3 
|align=left| Craig Tomlinson
|UD
|6
|12/06/1997
|align=left| Martin's West, Woodlawn, Maryland, U.S.
|align=left|
|-
|Win
|6-2-3 
|align=left| Josh Imardiyi
|PTS
|6
|30/03/1997
|align=left| Mohegan Sun Casino, Uncasville, Connecticut, U.S.
|align=left|
|-
|Win
|5-2-3 
|align=left| Exum Speight
|PTS
|6
|07/07/1996
|align=left| ABC Sports Complex, Springfield, Virginia, U.S.
|align=left|
|-
|Win
|4-2-3 
|align=left| Rashid Latif
|UD
|4
|28/06/1996
|align=left| Ukrainian Cultural Center, Somerset, New Jersey, U.S.
|align=left|
|-
|Win
|3-2-3 
|align=left| Dean Storey
|PTS
|6
|31/03/1996
|align=left| Sullivan Gymnasium, Portland, Maine, U.S.
|align=left|
|-
|Win
|2-2-3 
|align=left| Mike Whitfield
|UD
|6
|08/11/1995
|align=left| Hyatt Regency Hotel, Baltimore, Maryland, U.S.
|align=left|
|-
|Loss
|1-2-3 
|align=left| Rodney Price
|PTS
|4
|22/09/1995
|align=left| South Mountain Arena, West Orange, New Jersey, U.S.
|align=left|
|-
| Draw
|1-1-3 
|align=left| Derrick Lampkins
|PTS
|4
|18/08/1995
|align=left| Middletown, New York, U.S.
|align=left|
|-
|Win
|1-1-2 
|align=left| Georgy Peskov
|UD
|4
|02/06/1995
|align=left| Starlite Theatre, Latham, New York, U.S.
|align=left|
|-
| Draw
|0-1-2 
|align=left| Garth Hedger
|PTS
|4
|05/05/1995
|align=left| Center City, Schenectady, New York, U.S.
|align=left|
|-
|style="background:#DDD"|
|0-1-1 
|align=left| Domingo Monroe
|NC
|2
|28/01/1995
|align=left| Warwick, Rhode Island, U.S.
|align=left|
|-
|Loss
|0-1-1
|align=left| Kasson Saxton
|TKO
|1
|28/07/1994
|align=left| Convention Center, Atlantic City, New Jersey, U.S.
|align=left|
|-
| Draw
|0-0-1
|align=left| Maurice Harris
|PTS
|4
|21/06/1994
|align=left| The Roxy, Boston, Massachusetts, U.S.
|align=left|
|}

References

External links
 

Living people
1970 births
Heavyweight boxers
Boxers from New York (state)
Sportspeople from Poughkeepsie, New York
African-American boxers
American male boxers
21st-century African-American sportspeople
20th-century African-American sportspeople